The Cultural & Museum Centre Karonga (CMCK), commonly called Karonga Museum, is a cultural centre and museum in Karonga District, northern Malawi.

Background
The Karonga Museum was officially opened by then President Bingu wa Mutharika in November 2004

The centre's mission is to preserve and promote Karonga's natural and cultural heritage. The fossil discoveries of Dinosaurs & Early humans & pre-historic remains displayed at the museum provide insights into human origins and the history of life on earth.

Collections
The collection, preservation and display of the artefacts is undertaken by the Department of Antiquities, under the Department of Culture, in the Ministry of Information, Tourism, and Culture in conjunction with the Uraha Foundation. The emphasis of the Cultural Exhibition component is on community participation, local traditional and community leaders were urged to assist in assembling the different collections for exhibition.

The museum has a central exhibition which is dominated by the 130-million-year-old fossil of the Malawisaurus, which was discovered 45 km south from the centre site.

Outreach
The centre has a cultural activity area which provides a meeting place for the people of Karonga and their visitors. Still under construction, the building is a site for all sorts of cultural events such as drama, dance performances, music and choir events.

Its display & panorama area features 240 million years of Karonga history - from dinosaurs to democracy, including prehistoric landscapes, animals & early humans and their way of life, archaeological records, history of slave trade, colonial times, Malawi under Dr. Banda, culture and traditions of Karonga people.

Programmes
The Center for Field Research co-operates in international projects. With its unique concept the Karonga Cultural & Museum Center is a key factor for promoting appreciation of Malawi's Cultural & Natural heritage by educational development and research.

The buildings
The building that houses the Cultural Centre and the museum was constructed in 2004 for K30 million (US$276,000) was inspired by the excavated bones of the Malawisaurus that is the feature at the museum. During 2014, weather damage threatened the collection of fossils and other artefacts held at the centre. An appeal for K30million (US$) was made in order to repair the Onduline roof.

The building was designed by British Architect Kevin M Davies (BA (Hons) Dip Arch (Comm) RIBA ARB MIA
Director & Chartered Architect), and is one of his most cherished projects.

References

External links
  Cultural & Museum Centre Karonga (CMCK)- The Warm Heart of Malawi

Museums with year of establishment missing
Museums in Malawi
Heritage organizations
Local museums
Buildings and structures in Northern Region, Malawi